Shelter Cove is a small coastal indentation on the north shore of Prince Gustav Channel, between Chapel Hill and Church Point, Trinity Peninsula. The name, given by United Kingdom Antarctic Place-Names Committee (UK-APC), is descriptive of the only part of this coast which is sufficiently sheltered from the prevailing southwest winds to afford a reliable camp site.

Coves of Graham Land
Landforms of Trinity Peninsula